Rhonda Joy Kendall (born 17 March 1962) is an Australian former cricketer who played as an all-rounder, batting right-handed and bowling right-arm off break. She appeared in three One Day Internationals for Australia in 1987, and 12 One Day Internationals for International XI at the 1982 World Cup. She played domestic cricket for Western Australia and South Australia.

References

External links
 
 
 Rhonda Kendall at southernstars.org.au

Living people
1962 births
Cricketers from Perth, Western Australia
Australia women One Day International cricketers
International XI women One Day International cricketers
Western Australia women cricketers
South Australian Scorpions cricketers